Aurora lucis rutilat (Latin for "Dawn reddens with light") is the incipit of an Easter hymn 
of the Latin rite, first recorded in the Frankish Hymnal tradition (8th/9th century, one of the Murbach hymns) and preserved in the Benedictine "New Hymnal" (9th/10th century).
In the numbering introduced by Gneuss (1968), it is no. 41 of the Old Hymnal, and no. 72 of the New Hymnal. 
The hymn has 12 strophes of 4 verses each as originally recorded;in modern translations it is often reduced to 11 or fewer strophes. 
The Old High German interlinear version in Bodleian Junius 25 begins Tagarod leohtes lohazit.

Orlande de Lassus composed an adaptation as a motet for ten voices in c. 1592.
The portion Tristes erant apostoli (strophes 5 to 11) was adapted by Francisco Guerrero (1528–1599). Alberto Ginastera adapted it twice: first as the final movement of his opus 45 Turbae for choirs and orchestra, and then again as his opus 52 for solo organ, Variazioni e Toccata sopra Aurora lucis Rutilat.

Pope Urban VIII substantially altered the hymn for his edition of the Roman Breviary (1629), in the incipit replacing  rutilat by purpurat, the first strophe being altered from:
Aurora lucis rutilat, caelum laudibus intonat, mundus exultans iubilat, gemens infernus ululat. 
("Dawn reddens with light, the heavens resound with praise,  exulting the world jubilates, groaning hell shrieks.")
to:
Aurora coelum purpurat, aether resultat laudibus, mundus triumphans jubilat, horrens Avernus intremit. 
("Dawn purples the heavens, the aether rebounds with praise, triumphantly the world jubilates, frightful Avernus trembles.")

The original text  was restored in the reform of the Roman Breviary by Pope Pius X (1908/13).
In the 1908 Roman Breviary, the hymn has been revised and separated into three hymns, consisting of strophes 1–4, 5–8  and 9–11.
The first part forms the hymn for Lauds from Low Sunday to the Ascension, and begin in the revised form, Aurora caelum purpurat. 
The second part (Tristes erant apostoli) is incorporated into the Common of Apostles and Evangelists for paschal time at the first and second Vespers and Matins. It is sung in the Phrygian mode, in a melody found in the Vesperale Romanum.
The third part (Claro paschali gaudio) was incorporated into Lauds in the Common of Apostles in paschal time.

There are a number of English translations in use, both of the hymn as a whole and the three split hymns.
Singable English translations variously begin:
"The dawn was redd'ning [purpling] o'er the sky" (Edward Caswall  1849),
"With sparkling rays morn decks the sky" (J.A. Johnston  1852), 
"Light's very morn its beams displays" (J.D. Chambers 1857), 
"Light's glittering morn bedecks the sky" (J. M. Neale 1852).

Text

References

Stéphane Milovitch, Quotidianamente da prima del 1336: La processione che celebra la Morte e Risurrezione del Signore nella basilica del Santo Sepolcro di Gerusalemme (2014), 322ff.

External links

Latin-language Christian hymns
8th-century poems
Easter hymns
Dawn